Clay County is a county in the east central part of the U.S. state of Alabama. As of the 2020 census the population was 14,236. Its county seat is Ashland. Its name is in honor of Henry Clay, famous American statesman, member of the United States Senate from Kentucky and United States Secretary of State in the 19th century. It was the last dry county in Alabama with no wet cities within its boundaries, until a vote on March 1, 2016, approved the sale of alcohol in Lineville and Ashland.

History
Clay County was established on December 7, 1866, from land taken from Randolph and Talladega counties. Named after the famous statesman Henry Clay, the county seat itself was named after his estate in Lexington, Kentucky called "Ashland". The county was covered with a heavy growth of trees, and a part of the territory was occupied by the Creek Indians. The early pioneers acquired the lands by government entry and the Indian lands by public auction. The families came wholly from Fayette County, Georgia. Clay County was formed for geographic reasons. The citizens of the area had a difficult time reaching the county seat of Wedowee in Randolph County because of the Tallapoosa River to the east. Talladega was difficult to reach because of the intervening mountains. Even today, Clay County is one of only three counties in Alabama to have no U.S. highways in its boundaries.  Ashland was a mining center, particularly for graphite.

During the Desert Shield/Storm conflict, Clay County had more soldiers serving per capita than any other county in the United States.

Geography

Adjacent counties
Cleburne County – north
Randolph County – east
Tallapoosa County – south
Coosa County – southwest
Talladega County – west

National protected area
Talladega National Forest (part)

Transportation

Major highways
 State Route 9
 State Route 48
 State Route 49
 State Route 77
 State Route 148
 State Route 281

Rail
CSX Transportation
Norfolk Southern Railway

Demographics

2020 census

As of the 2020 United States census, there were 14,236 people, 5,198 households, and 3,704 families residing in the county.

2010 census
As of the census of 2010, there were 13,932 people, 5,670 households, and 3,978 families residing in the county. The population density was 23 people per square mile (9/km2).  There were 6,776 housing units at an average density of 11 per square mile (4/km2).  The racial makeup of the county was 81.7% White (non-Hispanic), 14.8% Black or African American, 0.4% Native American, 0.2% Asian, 0.0% Pacific Islander, 1.2% from other races, and 1.7% from two or more races. 2.9% of the population were Hispanic or Latino of any race.

2000 census
As of the census of 2000, there were 14,254 people, 5,765 households, and 4,098 families residing in the county.  The population density was 24 people per square mile (9/km2).  There were 6,612 housing units at an average density of 11 per square mile (4/km2).  The racial makeup of the county was 77.62% White (non-Hispanic), 19.70% Black or African American, 0.32% Native American, 0.10% Asian, 0.02% Pacific Islander, 0.46% from other races, and 0.79% from two or more races.  4.77% of the population were Hispanic or Latino of any race.

There were 5,670 households, out of which 27.1% had children under the age of 18 living with them, 52.7% were married couples living together, 12.8% had a female householder with no husband present, and 29.8% were non-families. 27.2% of all households were made up of individuals, and 11.8% had someone living alone who was 65 years of age or older.  The average household size was 2.41 and the average family size was 2.92.

In the county, the population was spread out, with 22.6% under the age of 18, 7.8% from 18 to 24, 23.8% from 25 to 44, 28.3% from 45 to 64, and 17.6% who were 65 years of age or older.  The median age was 42 years. For every 100 females, there were 96.3 males. For every 100 females age 18 and over, there were 96.4 males.

The median income for a household in the county was $35,595, and the median income for a family was $43,392. Males had a median income of $32,382 versus $30,000 for females. The per capita income for the county was $18,332.  About 18.5% of families and 18.8% of the population were below the poverty line, including 21.1% of those under age 18 and 15.4% of those age 65 or over.

Education 
Clay County contains one public school district. There are approximately 1,800 students in public PK-12 schools in Clay County.

Districts 
School districts include:

 Clay County School District

Government
Clay County is governed by a five-member Board of Commissioners:  Commissioner Morrison, Commissioner Harris, Commissioner Denny, Commissioner Milstead and Commissioner Burney. 
Within Clay County are two principal cities, Ashland and Lineville. The mayor of Ashland is Larry J. Fetner who works closely with five community members that run the city government, they are Billy Joe Smith for District 1, Bobbie Steed for District 2 he is also Mayor Pro Tem, Kim M. Cain for  District 3, Annette F. Gaither for District 4, Tommy Cantrell for District 5.

The second and smaller of the two cities is Lineville. The mayor is Roy Adamson and is also run by a five-member board. City Council members being as follows: Carolyn Smith for District 1, David Proctor for District 2, Joseph Appleby for District 3, Robert Milstead for District 4 and Johnny Appleby for District 5.

Legislators for the county are Rep. Richard Laird for State of Alabama House, District 37. Sen. Gerald Dial State of Alabama Senate, District 13. The U.S. Representatives are Rep. Mike Rogers (R-AL), 3rd District, Sen. Tommy Tuberville and Sen. Richard Shelby.

Clay County is reliably Republican at the presidential level. The last Democrat to win the county in a presidential election is Jimmy Carter, who won it by a plurality in 1980, even as he narrowly lost the state of Alabama to Ronald Reagan.

Communities

City
Lineville

Town
Ashland (county seat)

Census-designated places
 Delta
 Hollins
 Millerville

Unincorporated communities
 Brownsville
 Cleveland Crossroads
 Corinth
 Cragford
 Pinckneyville
 Springhill

Notable people
Hugo Black (1886–1971), born in Harlan, served as an associate justice of the U.S. Supreme Court from 1937 until 1971
Barney Lee Whatley (1885–1979), born on Idaho Rd, best friend and law partner of Hugo Black. Became a prominent Colorado attorney. 
LaFayette L. Patterson (1888–1987), born near Delta, served three terms in the U.S. Congress from 1928 to 1933
Byron Lavoy Cockrell (1935–2007), born in Lineville, rocket scientist and engineer
Kenneth F. Ingram (1929-2014), born in Ashland, Judge Alabama Court of Civil Appeals. Justice Alabama Supreme Court.
Bob Riley (b. 1944), U.S. Congressman and Alabama's 52nd governor, native of Ashland
Major General Flem Bowen Donnie Walker Jr. (b. 1964), Deputy Commanding General, US Army Central Command, native of Lineville

Places of interest
Clay County is home to parts of Cheaha State Park in the Talladega National Forest and Lake Wedowee on the eastern boundary. Outdoor adventures abound in Clay County and the surrounding area. The  Pinhoti Trail system weaves its way through the Talladega National Forest to Mt. Cheaha, the highest point in Alabama. Hikers along the trail may spy some of the local wildlife, including whitetail deer, wild turkey, and the rare bald eagle.

Home of Doc Hilt Trails for Off-Highway Vehicles. On May 5, 2010, Doc Hilt Trails was awarded the distinction of being a National Recreation Trail. One of only two private motorized parks in the nation to ever be awarded the NRT designation.

Clay County has two sites listed on the National Register of Historic Places, the Hugo Black House (destroyed, but still listed) and the Clay County Courthouse.

See also
National Register of Historic Places listings in Clay County, Alabama
Properties on the Alabama Register of Landmarks and Heritage in Clay County, Alabama

References

 

 
1866 establishments in Alabama
Counties of Appalachia
Populated places established in 1866